Macrocyclis is a genus of air-breathing land snails, terrestrial pulmonate gastropod mollusks in the family Macrocyclidae. Macrocyclis is a monotypic genus, i.e. a genus that contains only one species. The single living species in this genus is Macrocyclis peruvianus (Lamarck, 1822).

Distribution
Macrocyclis peruvianus is endemic to Chile and adjacent parts of Argentina. 
In Chile this is the largest species of land snail and it is found between the latitudes of 35° and 45° S, especially in the coastal regions, and in the Andean valleys.

References

Acavidae
Molluscs of Argentina
Molluscs of Chile
Monotypic gastropod genera
Fauna of the Valdivian temperate rainforest